Liam Thomas Mooney (born 18 May 1972) is a former professional rugby union footballer who played at prop. He is now an entrepreneur living in Guernsey with his wife and son.

Education 
Mooney was educated at St Boniface's Catholic College, Plymouth and graduated from the University of Cambridge (Hughes Hall) in 1996.

Rugby career 
Mooney began his rugby career with London Irish in 1992, making his debut as a prop against Bath aged 20 years old. He represented London Irish in both premiership and European competitions. Mooney played in the club's biggest premiership win, beating Harlequin F.C. 62–14 in April 1998. He was a member of the promotion winning team that took London Irish to the English Premiership in 1996, as well as the semi-final of the Pilkington Cup, under the leadership of Sir Clive Woodward. He moved on to play for Blackheath (1998–1999) and Exeter Chiefs (1999–2001). From 1996 in the professional era, Mooney scored 14 tries and made over 100 appearances for his clubs. While at Exeter, he played for the English National Divisions and scored the winning try against the Springboks on their 2000 tour of the UK. During his career, Mooney represented Ireland XV (vs Leinster 1996), Ireland A, Ireland U21, Ireland Students, the Barbarians and won two Cambridge Blues representing Cambridge University in the winning 1994 and 1995 Varsity matches. He finished his rugby career at 
Bristol and Caerphilly where he retired with a chronic knee injury.

Business career 
Mooney qualified as a solicitor of England & Wales in November 2000, having trained and worked at international law firm Kennedys and regional legal 500 law firm, Michelmores. In 2002, Mooney founded Blue Pencil, an international legal executive search and recruitment company, where he is currently the Managing Director. Blue Pencil is mentioned in Sidney Korshak's book "How to Land a Legal Job Overseas".

In November 2014, he was named by Arabian Business as 'Business Mentor of the Year' and was a finalist at the SME Stars of Business Awards in December 2014.

In August 2015, Mooney was named as a finalist in the Gulf Capital SME Awards, as the “Business Leader of the Year”.

Donations and Scholarships 

A lifetime member of Cambridge University Rugby Union Football Club (CURUFC), and a donor of the CURUFC's Red Lion Foundation, set up to support rugby players through their studies at the university, Mooney made a charitable donation to fund the Lion's Room in 2013.

Mooney has also a law scholarship for talented students looking to do an LLM at Hughes Hall, Cambridge University,

References 

1972 births
Living people
Alumni of Hughes Hall, Cambridge
Barbarian F.C. players
Blackheath F.C. players
British expatriates in Monaco
Businesspeople from Dubai
Cambridge University R.U.F.C. players
English businesspeople
English expatriates in Monaco
English rugby union players
Exeter Chiefs players
Ireland Wolfhounds international rugby union players
Irish Exiles rugby union players
London Irish players
Rugby union players from Gosport
Rugby union props